Relchela is a genus of plants in the grass family. The only known species is Relchela panicoides, native to Chile and Argentina (Neuquén, Río Negro, Chubut, Neuquén).

The name Relchela is a taxonomic anagram derived from Lechlera. The latter name is a taxonomic patronym honoring the German botanist Willibald Lechler (1814 - 1856).

Notes

References

Pooideae
Monotypic Poaceae genera
Flora of South America